"Hold My Hand" is a song by English singer and songwriter Jess Glynne. It was written by Jack Patterson, Janee Bennett, Ina Wroldsen and Glynne. The song was released on 20 March 2015 as her third solo single, following "Home" and "Right Here". A music video for the song was uploaded to Glynne's own YouTube channel on 23 February 2015. The song debuted at number one on the UK Singles Chart on 29 March 2015 and held that position for three consecutive weeks. It also reached number one in Wallonia (Belgium) and Israel, number seven in the Irish Singles Chart, and became Glynne's first solo chart entry on the US Billboard Hot 100, peaking at number 86 on the chart. The song was performed by Glynne on the semi-finals of The Voice UK and was also used in an advertisement for Coca-Cola in 2015. Since late 2015, it has featured in advertising for Jet2holidays, as well as being used for various in-aircraft announcements with Jet2.com. It is featured on the original movie soundtrack for the 2016 film Bridget Jones's Baby.

Composition 
"Hold My Hand" is written in the key of C major with a tempo of 123 beats per minute in common time. The verses follow a chord progression of C5C5/BC5/AFsus2C5/GC5, and Glynne's vocals span from G3 to A5.

Chart performance
"Hold My Hand" debuted at number one on the UK Singles Chart on 29 March 2015 with sales of 97,000. The single outsold its closest competitor, James Bay's "Hold Back the River", by over 40,000 units. The single became Glynne's first solo number one in the UK; she had previously scored two number one singles in 2014 as a featured artist, on Clean Bandit's "Rather Be" and Route 94's "My Love". The song retained the top position in its second week on the chart, with combined chart sales of just over 80,000, including 1.62 million streams. The song also retained the top position in its third week on the chart, beating Nick Jonas' "Jealous" in streaming format. In the United States, "Hold My Hand" debuted at number 88 on the Billboard Hot 100 chart, on the issue dated 3 October 2015 and has peaked at number 86.

In December 2015 the song was shortlisted for "Song of the Year" in the 2015 BBC Music Awards.

Music video
The official music video for "Hold My Hand" was uploaded to Glynne's own YouTube channel on 23 February 2015 and was directed by Emil Nava. In the Californian desert, mostly at sunset, Glynne rides an SUV and sings while encircled by dirt bikes, and also on a large truck. She and her friends enjoy a campfire and dance freely.

Track listing

Charts and certifications

Weekly charts

Year-end charts

Decade-end charts

Certifications

Release history

References

External links
 

2015 songs
2015 singles
Jess Glynne songs
Warner Music Group singles
Deep house songs
Number-one singles in Israel
Number-one singles in Scotland
UK Singles Chart number-one singles
Songs written by Ina Wroldsen
Song recordings produced by Starsmith
Songs written by Jess Glynne
Songs written by Jack Patterson (Clean Bandit)
Songs written by Jin Jin (musician)